The Dominican Day Parade in New York City is a parade organized by Americans of Dominican origin. The event started in 1982 as a local celebration with concerts and cultural events in the Washington Heights section of Manhattan. Organized by Dominican American community leaders, the parade is held annually each August on 6th Avenue. Similar parades are also held every year in Haverstraw, New York, Paterson, New Jersey, Boston, Lawrence, Massachusetts, Philadelphia and along the Grand Concourse in the Bronx.

No parade was held in 2020.

Parade and Related Events

The parade is held on 6th Avenue in New York City.  Marching proceeds from south to north, beginning on 38th Street.  
A gala is held on the second Friday in August before Sunday's parade. Locations of the gala will vary. visit dominicanparade.org for information. A scholarship awards banquet takes place in the fall.

Mission

The newly formed Dominican Day Parade, Inc. is a nonprofit 501 (c) 3, non-partisan organization in formation that organizes the annual parade and festivities.  The organization strives to provide an understanding of the heritage and contributions of the Dominican community in America and throughout the world.   The mission of the Dominican Day Parade, Inc. is to celebrate the richness of the Dominican culture, folklore and popular traditions.

Themes

The parade’s theme for 2015 is Education and Economic Empowerment.  The organization recognizes the lack of resources for youth that seek a formal education.  For that reason, Dominican Day Parade, Inc. has set a goal of creating a $250,000 Scholarship Fund.  The fund, the first of its kind in the recent history of the parade, will help pay for education that will, in turn, economically empower young Dominicans throughout the United States.

Board of directors

Over the past several years, the leadership of the Dominican Day Parade had been under scrutiny because the non-profit organization at its helm was not being run according to New York State law.  Under the direction of Attorney General Eric T. Schneiderman and Mayor Bill de Blasio, along with other elected officials and community leaders, in 2015, an entirely new entity and Board of Directors was created for what is now called the Dominican Day Parade, Inc.  The new members of the board include many distinguished people from the Dominican-American community, representing a variety of industries and backgrounds.

Date of Parade
The Dominican Day Parade is celebrated on the second Sunday of August to honor the start of the war for the “Second Independence” (La Guerra de la Restauracion).  Under the leadership of General Gregorio Luperon, the war was ultimately won from Spain.

In 1844, the Dominican Republic secured its independence from Haiti and became a sovereign state until 1861.  Under the leadership of General Pedro Santana, segments of the Dominican population sought to annex the Republic back to Spain and did so during March 18, 1861.  On August 16, 1863, the start of the war for the Restoration of the Dominican Republic under the command of General Luperon.  The Dominican Republic originally declared its independence from Spain on December 1, 1821.  Ultimately, the Dominican Republic was re-established, free from Spain, on March 3, 1865.

Dominicans in New York Dominican Day Parade

See also
 Labor Day Carnival
 Puerto Rican Day Parade

References 

Caribbean-American culture in New York City
Dominican-American culture in New York (state)
Festivals in New York City
Parades in New York City
Cultural festivals in the United States
1982 establishments in New York City
Latin American festivals
Hispanic and Latino American culture in New York City
Dominican Republic culture